The 1968 San Francisco State Gators football team represented San Francisco State College—now known as San Francisco State University—as a member of the Far Western Conference (FWC) during the 1968 NCAA College Division football season. Led by eighth-year head coach Vic Rowen, San Francisco State compiled an overall record of 5–5 with a mark of 3–3 in conference play, tying for third place in the FWC. For the season the team was outscored by its opponents 195 to 125. The Gators played home games at Cox Stadium in San Francisco.

Schedule

References

San Francisco State
San Francisco State Gators football seasons
San Francisco State Gators football